The 2004 Texas Senate elections took place as part of the biennial United States elections. Texas voters elected state senators in 15 State Senate districts. All of the seats up for this election were for two-year terms, with senators up for re-election in the 2008 elections.

Following the 2002 elections, the Republicans maintained effective control of the Senate with nineteen members to the Democrats' twelve.

To claim control of the chamber from Republicans, the Democrats needed to gain four seats. In the end, no seats changed hands.

Background 
The Republican Party had held the State Senate since the 1996 elections. In 2002, Republicans gained control of the Texas House of Representatives, giving them unified control of the state's government. This led to the 2003 Texas redistricting, where Republicans redrew the state's congressional districts which had been implemented by federal courts for the 2002 elections. During that session, eleven members of the Texas Senate left the state to break quorum in an attempt to prevent the plan from passing. This strategy eventually failed due to the defection of Senator John Whitmire of Houston.

Summary of race results

Summary of results by State Senate district

Notes

References

Senate
Texas Senate
Texas State Senate elections